Sir William Hamo Thornycroft  (9 March 185018 December 1925) was an English sculptor, responsible for some of London's best-known statues, including the statue of Oliver Cromwell outside the Palace of Westminster. He was a keen student of classical sculpture and was one of the youngest artists to be elected to the Royal Academy, in 1882, the same year the bronze cast of Teucer was purchased for the British nation under the auspices of the Chantrey Bequest.

He was a leading figure in the establishment of the New Sculpture movement, which provided a transition between the neoclassical styles of the 19th century and later modernist developments.

Biography

Early life and education

William Hamo Thornycroft was born in London into the Thornycroft family of sculptors. Both his parents, Thomas and Mary, and his grandfather, John, were distinguished sculptors. As a young child, Hamo was sent to live with an uncle on a farm in Cheshire until, aged nine, he began studying at the Modern Free Grammar School in Macclesfield, before in 1863 returning to London as a pupil at the University College School. He subsequently, from 1869, studied at the Royal Academy, where his primary influence was the painter-sculptor Frederic Leighton. While a student, Thornycroft assisted his father, Thomas, on the monumental sculptural group Boadicea and Her Daughters, later installed beside Westminster Bridge in London. At the Royal Academy Schools, Hamo Thornycroft won two medals and obtained his first paid commission for a work, a bust of a Dr. Sharpey. 

In 1871, Thornycroft visited Italy and Paris and assisted his parents in creating the Poets' Fountain for Park Lane in London, which was subsequently destroyed in the Second World War, for which he modelled several figures of poets in marble and bronze. During the first half of the 1870s he exhibited works on a regular basis at the Royal Academy, showing Fame, the Sharpey bust, a bust of Mrs Mordaunt and a model for an equestrian statue of Lord Mayo. In 1876 Thornycroft won the Gold Medal of the Royal Academy with the statue Warrior Bearing a Wounded Youth.

Early career
Thornycroft created a series of statues in the ideal genre in the late 1870s and early 1880s that sought to reanimate the format of the classical statue. These included Lot's Wife (1878) and Artemis and her Hound (1880 plaster, 1882 marble). In 1880 he was elected an Associate of the Royal Academy, and produced the Homeric bowman Teucer (1881 plaster, 1882 bronze), and the Mower (1884 plaster, 1894 bronze), arguably the first life-size freestanding statue of a contemporary labourer in 19th-century sculpture. Both Artemis and her Hound and Teucer combined classical compositions with a increased sense of naturalism to imply movement and energy. A companion piece to the Mower, the Sower, was exhibited in 1886 at the Royal Academy. When, in 1894, the critic Edmund Gosse coined the term "The New Sculpture", he formulated its early principles from Thornycroft's work.

After 1884, Thornycroft's reputation was secure and he won commissions for a number of major monuments, most notably the innovative General Gordon in Trafalgar Square and since moved to Victoria Embankment Gardens. Other significant works he created included an effigy of Harvey Goodwin, Bishop of Carlisle (1895; Carlisle Cathedral), and the statues of Oliver Cromwell (Westminster), Dean Colet (a bronze group, early Italianate in feeling, outside St Paul's School, formerly in Hammersmith and now in Barnes, London), Alfred the Great (Winchester), the Gladstone Memorial (in the Strand, London) and Mandell Creighton, Bishop of London (bronze, erected in St Paul's Cathedral). Other significant memorials were built in several cities then in the British Empire.

Architectural work
The Institute of Chartered Accountants in England and Wales (ICAEW) Council commissioned Thornycroft to produce a detailed sculpted frieze for their headquarters at Chartered Accountants' Hall for a cost of £3,000. Thornycroft's frieze, carved between 1889 and 1893, includes a series of figures representing Arts, Sciences, Crafts, Education, Commerce, Manufacture, Agriculture, Mining, Railways, Shipping, India, the Colonies, and Building. The figure of the architect is based on the Hall's architect, John Belcher, and the sculptor on Thornycroft himself. The figure of the solicitor is H. Markby of Markby, Stewart & Co., who acted for ICAEW in its early years.

Later works
Thornycroft continued to be a central member of the sculptural establishment and the Royal Academy into the 20th century. He was awarded the medal of honour at the 1900 Paris Exhibition, and was knighted in 1917. In 1901, he began a series of small bronze statuettes for the home market while continuing to work on large commissions. His single largest work, the monument to Lord Curzon, was unveiled in Calcutta in 1913. 

Thornycroft exhibited The Kiss, a large ideal pieces he had worked on for three years, at the Royal Academy in 1916, and received a standing ovation from his fellow artists when it was unveiled. He was awarded the first gold medal bestowed by the Royal Society of British Sculptors in 1924, although he had previously, in 1908, declined the offer of the presidency of that body. Thornycroft's last major work was the tomb effigy of Bishop Huyshe Yeatman-Biggs which was shown at the Royal Academy in 1925 and subsequently installed in Coventry Cathedral.

Thornycroft became increasingly resistant to new developments in sculpture, although his work of the early 1880s helped to catalyse sculpture in the United Kingdom towards those new directions. In sum, he provided an important transition between the neoclassical and academic styles of the 19th century and its fin-de-siècle and modernist departures.

A blue plaque commemorates Thornycroft at 2b Melbury Road, Kensington, his studio designed by his lifelong friend the architect John Belcher, c. 1892.

Family
In addition to his parents, Thornycroft's grandfather John Francis was also a distinguished sculptor. His brother, Sir John Isaac Thornycroft, became a successful naval engineer; their sister, Theresa, was the mother of the poet Siegfried Sassoon; Theresa and sisters Alyce and Helen Thornycroft were artists.

In 1884, Hamo married Agatha Cox, who was fourteen years his junior. At a dinner in 1889, Agatha was introduced to Thomas Hardy, who later described her as "the most beautiful woman in England" and admitted that she was one of the models for the title character in his novel Tess of the D'Urbervilles. Agatha and her husband were interested in the concept of "artistic dress", and a dress worn by her (presumed to be her wedding dress) is held in the costume collection of the Victoria & Albert Museum, donated by their daughter, Mary Elfrida Thornycroft, who was also his biographer.

Selected public works

1878 to 1889

1890 to 1899

1900 to 1909

1910 to 1925

Other works
 Lord Mayo, 1876, Kolkata, India, bronze equestrian statue, relocated to Barrackpore
 Thomas Clarkson, 1877, St Mary's Church, Playford, Suffolk, memorial relief in marble
 Thomas Gray, 1885, Chapel of Pembroke College, Cambridge, marble bust and bronze relief
 Sir John Goss, 1886, St Paul's Cathedral, marble panel within a larger monument by John Belcher
 Henry Bradshaw, 1887, Fitzwilliam Museum, Cambridge, marble bust
 General Gordon, 1889, Melbourne, Australia, bronze statue on pedestal
 George Leveson-Gower, exhibited 1895, unveiled 1896, Central Lobby, Houses of Parliament, marble statue
 Marble statue of Sir Steuart Bayley, completed 1894, erected 1896 Kolkata, located in Dalhousie Square, Kolkata until the 1950s, current location unknown
 Bishop Harvey Goodwin, 1895, Carlisle Cathedral, bronze effigy with figures
 James Timmins Chance, 1897, West Smethwick Park, Smethwick, bronze bust
 Boer War Memorial, 1905, Durban, bronze figure of Peace Descending on pedestal with two figures of lions and four reliefs of military scenes
 Marble seated statue of Queen Victoria, erected Ajodhya, India, 1908, moved to the State Museum Lucknow during 1981-82 A copy of this statue, also in marble, was erected at Qaisar Bagh in Lucknow and is now in the same museum
 Bronze bust of Bishop Mandell Creighton, 1909, Lambeth Palace, London
 George V as the Prince of Wales, 1911, Kolkata, marble statue
 Lord Curzon, 1912, approach to the grounds of the Victoria Memorial, Kolkata, bronze statue on Portland stone pedestal with four supporting figures and four reliefs, partly dismantled with the figure of Curzon relocated to Barrackpore. The four figures representing Famine Relief, Agriculture, Commerce and Peace remain in their original location as do the four relief panels
 Bust of Thomas Hardy, 1915, National Portrait Gallery, London
 Edward VII, 1917, Frere Park, Karachi, marble statue on pedestal with bronze groups, representing Britannia and Peace, and statues of a British soldier and of Khudadad Khan, VC, at base. Now damaged and dismantled as an assembly with the remains in the Mohatta Palace in Karachi.

Gallery

Writings 
 "Lecture to the Sculpture Students of the Royal Academy of Art, 1885" reprinted in the Journal of the Walpole Society, vol. 69 (2007): 211–26.

References

Further reading 

 
 
Beattie, Susan. The New Sculpture. New Haven: Yale University Press, 1983.
Friedman, Terry, ed. The Alliance of Sculpture and Architecture. Leeds: Henry Moore Institute, 1993.
Getsy, David, "The Problem of Realism in Hamo Thornycroft's 1885 Royal Academy Lecture," The Walpole Society 69 (2007): 211–25.
Gosse, Edmund. "Our Living Artists: Hamo Thornycroft, A.R.A." Magazine of Art, 1881, pp. 328–32.
 Read, Benedict. Victorian Sculpture. New Haven: Yale University Press, 1982.
White, Adam. Hamo Thornycroft and the Martyr General. Leeds: Henry Moore Institute, 1991.

External links

 
 Papers of the Thornycroft Family, in the Archive of Sculptors Papers at the Henry Moore Institute, Leeds
 Thornycroft works in the Tate Collection, London
 The Victorian Web, featuring links to images of works
 
 

1850 births
1925 deaths
20th-century English sculptors
19th-century English sculptors
English male sculptors
People of the Victorian era
British architectural sculptors
Royal Academicians
Sculptors from London
Knights Bachelor
People educated at University College School
Hamo
Artists' Rifles soldiers
Sibling artists